2nd Civil Affairs Group (2nd CAG) is a civil affairs (CA) unit of the United States Marine Corps. It is based at Naval Support Facility Anacostia, Washington, D.C. and is part of the Force Headquarters Group of the Marine Forces Reserve. 2nd CAG mostly supports II MEF. The unit was deactivated in June 2019 and turned into Marine Corps Advisor Company (MCAC) Alpha and Marine Corps Advisor Company Bravo.

Organization
2nd CAG is commanded by a Colonel and the unit has 38 Marine officers, 85 Marine enlisted, 4 Navy officers and 1 Navy enlisted. The unit consists of one headquarters detachment and four line detachments. The headquarters detachment also contains a standing G9 staff section of 24 Marines ready for rapid mobilization to support a brigade or larger unit.

History
On 1 October 2013, 2nd CAG stood up from 4th Civil Affairs Group. In June 2019, the unit was deactivated and integrated again into the 4th Civil Affairs Group.

Notable members
Charles Lollar, running for Governor of Maryland
Colonel Lawrence Kaifesh ran for U.S. Congress in the IL-8 District.

References

Civil affairs groups of the United States Marine Corps
Force Headquarters Group
Inactive units of the United States Marine Corps